Namtso or Lake Nam (officially: Namco; ; ; ; “Heavenly Lake” in European literature: Tengri Nor) is a mountain lake on the border between  Damxung County of Lhasa prefecture-level city and Baingoin County of Nagqu Prefecture in the Tibet Autonomous Region of China, approximately  NNW of Lhasa.

Geography 
Namtso (Namco) is a lake that first formed during the Paleogene age, as a result of Himalayan tectonic plate movements. This salt lake is the largest lake in the Tibet Autonomous Region. However, it is not the largest lake on the Qinghai-Tibet Plateau.

Namtso has five uninhabited islands of reasonable size, in addition to one or two rocky outcrops.  The islands have been used for spiritual retreat by pilgrims who walk over the lake's frozen surface at the end of winter, carrying their food with them.  They spend the summer there, unable to return to shore again until the water freezes the following winter.  This practice is no longer permitted by Chinese authorities.

Climate
The weather at Namtso is subject to abrupt, sudden change and snowstorms are very common across the Nyainqêntanglha range.

Namtso has a  Köppen climate classification of alpine or tundra climate (Koppen ET).

Other Features 

Namtso is renowned as one of the most beautiful places in the Nyainqêntanglha mountain range. Its cave hermitages have for centuries been the destination of Tibetan pilgrims.  A surfaced road across Laken Pass at 5186 m was completed to the lake in 2005, enabling easy access from Lhasa and the development of tourism at the lake. Settlements in the area include Dobjoi, Donggar and Cha'gyungoinba. The Tashi Dor monastery is located at the southeastern corner of the lake.

Around the area's natural elements, historical and anthropological background, a 2010 romantic drama  Shangri-La, starring China's popular actor Hu Ge, was broadcast at CCTV1 and received positive reviews. Some scenes in the 2002 Hong Kong film The Touch were filmed at the lake. Namtso Lake was featured in Episode 4, The Roof of the World, of BBC TV series: Himalaya with Michael Palin.

Gallery

Asteroid 
Asteroid 248388 Namtso, discovered by Italian astronomer Vincenzo Casulli in 2005, was named after the lake. The official  was published by the Minor Planet Center on 5 October 2017.

See also 

 Gomang Co
 Kanas Lake
 Lake Urru
 Laken Pass (Lakenla)
 Siling Lake

References

External links

Lakes of Tibet
Buddhist pilgrimage sites in China
Geography of Lhasa
Saline lakes of Asia
Damxung County